Avon Valley Country Park is a  country park in Keynsham, Somerset, England.

The park offers a variety of rides for children including Chair-o-planes, a small children's chair swing, Dino Jeeps (a dirt track with dinosaur animatronics where children drive miniature electric jeeps), the Big Red, an outdoors drop slide, the Strawberry Line Miniature Railway, and the Play Barn (a big indoor softplay area with a drop slide which is taller than the outside one). There are also animals in Pets' Corner and the Animal Barn.

The site was common grazing land in the 15th century and later became a farm. In 1976, it was purchased as a "pick-your-own" fruit farm and subsequently developed into the country park.

Miniature railway

Within the park is the Strawberry Line, a  length of  gauge railway. It is Britain's only commercial ground-level 5 in guiage railway. It opened in 1999 and now has one steam and 10 mock diesel engines which are battery operated.

References

External links
 
 

Country parks in Somerset
Keynsham